Lachnomyrmex longinoi is a species of ant in the subfamily Myrmicinae found in Honduras , Nicaragua , Costa Rica.

References

External links

Myrmicinae
Insects described in 2008
Hymenoptera of North America